Berryden is an area of Aberdeen quite near to the city centre.

Berryden Retail Park is the main shopping destination in the north side of Aberdeen, with large chain store, smaller shops and a children's play centre. The retail park was purchased by Frasers Group in October 2020.

Kittybrewster Retail Park is just a few minutes away, and houses similar retailers and services.

References

External links
 Berryden Retail Park on CompletelyRetail.co.uk

Areas of Aberdeen
Retail parks in the United Kingdom
Buildings and structures in Aberdeen
Economy of Aberdeen